Mike McGinnis (born 1973) is an American saxophonist, clarinetist, and composer.

Early life
Mike McGinnis was born in 1973 in Sanford, Maine where he grew up. McGinnis began saxophone lessons with Bill Street in 1987.  He studied music at the University of Southern Maine and Eastman School of Music and has been studying traditional harmony and counterpoint with NYC teacher Paul Caputo since 2004.

Career
McGinnis recorded his debut CD, Tangents, with his group Between Green (which included Shane Endsley and Jacob Sacks) for Ravi Coltrane's RKM Music label in 2000.  As a co-leader he has recorded four albums with The Four Bags, one with DDYGG and one with OK|OK.  He also appeared in director Ang Lee's Taking Woodstock as the flute player.

References

External links

1973 births
Living people
American clarinetists
American male saxophonists
Eastman School of Music alumni
People from Sanford, Maine
Musicians from Maine
21st-century American saxophonists
21st-century clarinetists
21st-century American male musicians
The Delphian Jazz Orchestra members